Leptoxis carinata, common name the crested mudalia, is a species of freshwater snail with an operculum, an aquatic gastropod mollusk in the family Pleuroceridae.

Shell description 
Leptoxis carinata has a strong globose shell, with highly variable sculpture.  In various creeks and rivers throughout its range, populations may be found with spiral cords, a single carina or keel, variously developed, or lacking sculpture.

Distribution 
This species occurs in unpolluted large creeks and high-gradient rivers in the Atlantic drainages of the United States, from New York to North Carolina.

Ecology

Habitat 
Leptoxis carinata is found in high-gradient streams, generally in the faster flowing riffles and drops, where it clings firmly to large stones and bedrock exposures.

Life cycle 
Leptoxis carinata is semelparous biennial.

This species, unlike softer shelled physid snails, grows very slowly, and has the lowest intrinsic rate of increase (this means that populations grow very slowly), along with Elimia virginica, in this environment.

References

Further reading 
 Stewart T. W. & Garcia J. E. (2002). "Environmental Factors Causing Local Variation in Density and Biomass of the Snail Leptoxis carinata, in Fishpond Creek, Virginia". American Midland Naturalist 148(1) 172–180. JSTOR.

Pleuroceridae
Gastropods described in 1792